Volleyball events were contested at the 1979 Summer Universiade in Mexico City, Mexico.

References
 Universiade volleyball medalists on HickokSports

U
1979 Summer Universiade
Volleyball at the Summer Universiade